The 2018 Dubai Sevens is the twentieth edition of the Dubai Sevens tournament. It was the first tournament within the 2018–19 World Rugby Sevens Series. It was held on 30 November–1 December 2018 at The Sevens Stadium in Dubai, United Arab Emirates.

Format
The sixteen teams are drawn into four pools of four teams each. Each team plays every other team in their pool once. The top two teams from each pool advance to the Cup bracket where teams compete for the Gold, Silver, and Bronze Medals. The bottom two teams from each group go to the Challenge Trophy bracket.

Teams
Fifteen core teams are participating in the tournament along with one invited team, 2018 Africa Men's Sevens winners Zimbabwe:

Pool stage
All times in UAE Standard Time (UTC+4:00)

Pool A

Pool B

Pool C

Pool D

Knockout stage

Thirteenth place

Challenge Trophy

Fifth place

Cup

Tournament placings

Source: World Rugby

Players

Scoring leaders

Source: World Rugby

See also
 2018 Dubai Women's Sevens
 World Rugby Sevens Series
 2018–19 World Rugby Sevens Series
 World Rugby

References

External links 
 Tournament site
 World Rugby info

2018
2018–19 World Rugby Sevens Series
2018 in Emirati sport
2018 in Asian rugby union
Dubai Sevens
Dubai Sevens